The Sailor's Return may refer to:

 Thomas and Sally, an operetta by Thomas Arne
 The Sailor's Return (novel), a 1925 British novel by David Garnett
 The Sailor's Return (film), a 1978 film adaptation of the novel